Filip Alfons De Wilde (born 5 July 1964) is a former Belgian professional footballer who played as a goalkeeper.

During a 23-year professional career he played mainly with Anderlecht, appearing in nearly 400 official games in two different spells. He also competed in Portugal and Austria.

De Wilde represented Belgium for 11 years, playing for the country in three World Cups and Euro 2000.

Club career
De Wilde was born in Zele, East Flanders. At the age of nine he entered local Eendracht Zele's youth system, joining the famous K.S.K. Beveren goalkeeper school in 1980. He then signed for R.S.C. Anderlecht after five full seasons, where he became a legend; during his first stint he won four national championships, three Belgian Cups and two Supercups.

In 1996, De Wilde left Brussels and his country and joined Sporting Clube de Portugal but, after losing first-choice status to youngster Tiago, returned home to Anderlecht in April 1998, for the rest of that campaign and five more (being first-choice until his last year).

In January 2004, after a brief spell in Austria with SK Sturm Graz, De Wilde joined, at 39, K.S.C. Lokeren Oost-Vlaanderen, for his final two seasons as a professional. He did play however during two months (April–May 2005) for lowly K.F.C. Verbroedering Geel.

International career
De Wilde was on the Belgium national team in three FIFA World Cups: 1990, 1994 and 1998. He played the first of his 33 games with the Red Devils against Denmark in a 1989 friendly, coming on as a substitute for Gilbert Bodart at half-time.

In the first two World Cups, De Wilde acted as backup to legendary Michel Preud'homme but, after the latter's retirement he became first-choice, playing in the 1998 edition. His last international appearance was a sour one, as the match against Turkey at the UEFA Euro 2000 was lost by the hosts 0–2 and he was sent off with seven minutes to go (previously, he hesitated and lost the ball to opposing striker Hakan Şükür, who opened the scoresheet), as Belgium was eliminated in the first round.

Coaching career
Upon retiring in June De Wilde immediately rejoined former side Anderlecht, as a goalkeeping coach.

De Wilde began working with the Belgian under-21s in 2012, still as a goalkeeper coach.

Honours

Club
Beveren
Belgian First Division: 1983–84
Belgian Cup: 1982–83; Runner-up 1984–85
Belgian Supercup: 1984; Runner-up 1983

Anderlecht
Belgian First Division: 1990–91, 1992–93, 1993–94, 1994–95, 1999–2000, 2000–01
Belgian Cup: 1987–88, 1988–89, 1993–94
Belgian Super Cup: 1985, 1987, 1993, 1995, 2000, 2001
Belgian League Cup: 2000
Belgian Sports Team of the Year: 2000
European Cup Winners' Cup: 1989-90 (runners-up)
Jules Pappaert Cup: 2000, 2001
Bruges Matins: 1988

Individual
Belgian Professional Goalkeeper of the Year: 1994, 2000
Belgian Fair Play Award: 1995-96

References

External links
 Stats at Voetbal International 
 
 
 
 
 

1964 births
Living people
People from Zele
Footballers from East Flanders
Belgian footballers
Association football goalkeepers
Belgian Pro League players
K.F.C. Eendracht Zele players
K.S.K. Beveren players
R.S.C. Anderlecht players
K.S.C. Lokeren Oost-Vlaanderen players
Primeira Liga players
Sporting CP footballers
Austrian Football Bundesliga players
SK Sturm Graz players
Belgium international footballers
1990 FIFA World Cup players
1994 FIFA World Cup players
1998 FIFA World Cup players
UEFA Euro 2000 players
Belgian expatriate footballers
Expatriate footballers in Portugal
Expatriate footballers in Austria
Belgian expatriate sportspeople in Portugal
R.S.C. Anderlecht non-playing staff